Büsumer Deichhausen (formerly "Dykhusen") is a municipality belonging to the Amt ("collective municipality") Büsum-Wesselburen in the district Dithmarschen in Schleswig-Holstein, Germany.

Büsumer Deichhausen is situated on the North Sea coast of the Meldorf Bight just east of Büsum. Its name is derived from the words Deich/Dyk (dike) and Haus/Hus (house). It is called Büsumer Deichhausen to distinguish it from the municipality Wesselburener Deichhausen. Its economy is based on a mix of farming and tourism.

References

Dithmarschen